Crambus pratella is a species of moth of the family Crambidae. It is found in Europe and  Asia Minor.

The wingspan is 22–25 mm. Forewings with apex somewhat produced; brown, sometimes ochreous-mixed, in male with grey, in female with whitish blackish-edged interneural streaks; a subcostal white streak on basal half; a white median streak, upper edge straight, lower edge projecting in middle, cut by sharply angulated dark brown median line; second line angulated, white, edged with dark brown, preceded by white costal mark; a white terminal streak, with several black dots; cilia metallic. Hindwings are rather dark grey [applies partly to Crambus pascuella but this is smaller and has a narrower longitudinal streak]. The larva is greenish-grey or brownish-grey; dots darker; head brown, darker-marked.

The moth flies from May to August depending on the location.

The larvae feed on various grasses, especially Deschampsia species.

References

External links

 Crambus pratella at UKmoths
 Lepidoptera of Belgium
 Lepiforum.de

Crambini
Moths described in 1758
Moths of Europe
Taxa named by Carl Linnaeus